Islamic coalition may refer to:
Islamic coalition (Syria), a Syrian rebel coalition
Islamic Coalition, an Iraqi electoral coalition
Islamic Military Alliance to fight terrorism